The Murcia tram is a tram/light rail system operational in the Spanish city of Murcia. The  system opened in 2011 and links the city centre with the northern suburbs.

Background
In April 2007 a  demonstration line was opened, built by the Tranvimur joint venture of Acciona and Grupo Cívica, along Avenida Juan Carlos I. The trail was deemed successful in August 2008 and the rest of the system was built after a tendering process, which awarded a contract to Sociedad Concesionaria Tranvía de Murcia, a consortium of the companies COMSA EMTE Concesiones and FCC. The contract provided for the construction of the current system and operation of the system for a duration of 40 years at a price of 264 million Euros. The current system opened in 2011.

Line 1
Line 1 is the principle line of the system and includes 24 of the system's 28 stations. The line starts in the north-west of the city with a three kilometer single direction loop around the campus of the University of Murcia and goes down Avenida Jan Carlos I towards the city centre where it goes through the Plaza Circular. The tram then travels northward along Avenida Don Juan de Borbón, before branching off toward the Estadio Nueva Condomina, where it terminates. The line totals 14.5 kilometers.

Line 1B
Line 1B is a three kilometer branch line which connects with line 1 at the Los Rectores-Tierra Natura station. The line travels has five stops and terminates at UCAM-Los Jerónimos station adjacent to the Universidad Católica San Antonio de Murcia.

Rolling Stock
The system uses a total of 11 Alstom Citadis 302 units. The units were originally purchased by Madrid for use in the Metro Ligero system. Two of the units were used during the pilot line, and the remaining nine were acquired by the construction consortium. The maintenance yard and depot is located directly adjacent to the La Ladera station.

Network Map

References

Tram transport in Spain
Light rail in Spain
Murcia
Railway lines opened in 2011
2011 establishments in Spain